Enteromius greenwoodi is a species of ray-finned fish in the genus Enteromius from Angola.

The fish is named in honor of Peter Humphry Greenwood (1927-1995), the Curator of the Fish Section of the British Museum (Natural History), and author of many papers on African fishes in general and Enteromius in particular.

Footnotes 

 

Endemic fauna of Angola
Enteromius
Taxa named by Max Poll
Fish described in 1967